A list of films produced in the United Kingdom in 1984 (see 1984 in film):

1984

See also
1984 in British music
1984 in British radio
1984 in British television
1984 in the United Kingdom

References

External links

1984
Films
Lists of 1984 films by country or language